Herriott House, also known as the Brown-Richey House, is a historic home located in Franklin, Johnson County, Indiana. The house was built between 1860 and 1865, and is a two-story, rectangular, Italianate style brick dwelling with a hipped roof.  It features an elaborate wooden front porch added between 1876 and 1884 (rebuilt 1981) and overhanging eaves with decorative brackets.

It was listed on the National Register of Historic Places in 1982.

References

Houses on the National Register of Historic Places in Indiana
Italianate architecture in Indiana
Houses completed in 1865
Buildings and structures in Johnson County, Indiana
National Register of Historic Places in Johnson County, Indiana